Barzillai is a masculine given name. Notable people with the name include:

Barzillai, biblical figure
Barzillai ben Baruch Jabez, Turkish Talmudist of the seventeenth and eighteenth centuries
Barzillai J. Chambers (1817–1895), American surveyor, lawyer, and politician
Barzillai Gannett (1764–1832), U.S. Representative from Massachusetts 
Barzillai Gray (1824–1918), American judge
Barzillai Jones, Dean of Lismore
Barzillai Lew (1743—1822), African-American soldier
Barzillai Quaife (1798–1873), English-born editor

See also
Barzilai (surname)
Barzillai Weeks House

Masculine given names